Teignmouth Philip Melvill (13 February 1877 – 12 December 1951) was an English champion polo player.

Biography
Melvill was the son of Teignmouth Melvill,a recipient of the Victoria Cross.

He played for England against the United States in the 1924 International Polo Cup. He played in the number 1 position.

Melvill competed for Great Britain in the 1920 Summer Olympics at Antwerp. The British Polo Team defeated Spain in the final to win the Gold Medal. He died on 12 December 1951.

References 

1877 births
1951 deaths
English polo players
English Olympic medallists
Polo players at the 1920 Summer Olympics
Olympic polo players of Great Britain
Olympic gold medallists for Great Britain
Olympic medalists in polo
International Polo Cup
Roehampton Trophy
Medalists at the 1920 Summer Olympics
Teignmouth Philip